Mohamed Abdel-Fatah Mohamed Abdulaziz Helal (born March 20, 1980), better known as Hamada Helal, is an Egyptian singer, actor, and composer who was born in Faqous, Sharqia Governorate, Egypt. He now resides in Cairo. Hamada started his interest singing when he was 5 years old. He used to record his voice whilst singing on cassette tapes. Helal has presented several albums and has presented work in cinema and television.

Early life
Hamada Helal's real name is "Mohamed Abdel Fattah Mohamed Abdel Aziz Helal". Born in Sharkia governorate, he and his family, consisting of a brother "Medhat", and two sisters "Hind" and "Nour" moved to Cairo in the Al-Zawia Al-Hamra area. Helal started singing when he was 5 years old. He used to record his voice whilst singing on cassette tapes. Many artists influenced Hamada, such as Abdel Halim Hafez, Mohamed Abdel Wahab and Umm Kulthum. At school, He sang during school breaks and entertainment periods. His relatives noticed the beauty of his voice, so they asked him to sing at weddings and birthdays. When Helal was seven, one of his relatives heard him singing and took him to a musician. He learned the music basics and was encouraged. The musician told Helal that he would introduce him to sing at his relatives' wedding. This was the starting point of his career. He worked from an early age in various professions while his studies and music career to contribute to the livelihood of his family, which was going through difficult financial circumstances. He joined the Faculty of Tourism and Hotels in 1997.

Career

Beginnings and breakthrough years (1996-2005)
Helal met the artist Hassan Esh Ish, who after hearing his singing introduced him to, which made him introduce him to the artist Hamid Al Shaeri, who in turn introduced him to those in charge of a recording company. His launch was through a cocktail album released by High Quality, among many young talents; its success led to the producing company encouraged to release an album in 1996 called Al-Ayyam , and within eight songs. At the time of the release of Al-Ayyam, he was 16 years old. This album won the approval of the public at the time, and achieved wide success. Al-Ayyam was an entry visa for Hamada Hilal to the world of fame, as he achieved more than 150,000 copies of sales, after which he presented  albums such as Dar Al-Zaman in 1998, and Domoaa in 2000.  Bakhaf, his fourth album, was released in 2002, followed by his fifth album Waheshni in 2004.

Film appearances  (2005 onwards)
Helal made his film debut in the movie Eial Habiba (Lover Boys) in 2005. One year later he made another appearance in El Eial Herbet (The Boys Escaped) as one of the main characters Hassan. In the movie he sang 3 songs: Azza, Kan lazim, and Mastool. In 2007 Hamada Helal starred in the movie El Hob keda (This is love) acting as one of the main characters Seif.  He sang one of his most famous songs Lama Betelmisny (When You Touch Me) which would later be added to his 2008 album Bahebak Akher Haja, in that same year Hamada starred in the movie Helm Elomar (Dream of a lifetime) in which he acted as the role of a boxer who wanted to reach the world championship. In 2011, he appeared in the movie Amn Dawlat (State Security) in which he played the role of state security officer followed by 2012 movie Mr. & Mrs Oweis. He also released his album Matkoulahash in that same year. Then he appeared in 2014 movie Hamati Bithibbeni (My Mother-in-law Loves Me) where he portrayed the role of plastic surgeon who himself undergoes psychological treatment. And then followed by his appearance as a con man in 2017 movie Shantet Hamza (Hamza's Bag).

Personal life

Helal married the Palestinian "Asmaa Samih" in 2009, and they have two children, a daughter named Rama Helal and a son Youssef Helal.

Discography

Filmography

References

21st-century Egyptian male singers
Singers from Cairo
People from Sharqia Governorate
Living people
Egyptian male actors
Egyptian composers
1980 births